Spiritual Life Music is a music and art company and a record label that focuses on underground dance music. It emerged from the New York City dance record store Dancetracks owned by Joaquin Claussell and Stefan Prescott.

With locals from the black diaspora such as Haiti (Jephté Guillaume), Puerto Rico (Joe Claussell and brother José Claussell), the Caribbean and Africa (Ola Jagun, Femi Kuti).
Albeit largely implemented in dance music and African sources, Spiritual Life Music provides a myriad of fusion sounds from jazz, electronica, songs and many others.

From 2000 to 2004, the label promoted artists on the underground club including 3 Generations Walking ("Slavery Days", "To Live"), Slam Mode ("Clouds", "Uhuru"), Jephté Guillaume ("The Prayer", "Voyages of Dreams", "Pouki", "Lakou-A"), Nitin Sawhney ("Homelands" remixes), and Mental Remedy (Jephté Guillaume and Joaquin "Joe" Claussell; "Kotu Rete", "Agora e seu Tempo").

External links
 – official site

American record labels